Sono innocente is a studio album by Italian singer-songwriter Vasco Rossi, produced by Guido Elmi and Rossi himself and released by Universal on 4 November 2014. The album was previewed on 30 November 2014, during the Medimex, the annual Exhibition of Music Innovation held in Bari, Apulia.

Despite being released in November, the album became the best-selling record of 2014.

Track listing

Credits 

 Vasco Rossi - Producer
 Guido Elmi - Producer (track 1,2,3,5,6,7,8,9,11,12,13)
 Celso Valli - Producer (track 4,10)
 Saverio Principini - Producer, Recording, Mixing Engineer (track 14,15)
 Nicola Venieri - Recording, Mixing Engineer (track 1,2,3,5,6,7,8,9,11,12,13)
 Maurizio Bianconi - Mastering Engineer (track 1,2,3,4,5,6,7,8,9,10,11,12,13)
 Marco Borsatti - Recording, Mixing Engineer (track 4,10)
 Marco Sonzini - Recording, Mixing Engineer (track 14,15)
 Gavin Lurssen - Mastering Engineer (track 14,15)

Charts

Weekly charts

Year-end charts

Certifications

See also
 List of best-selling albums by year (Italy)

References

2014 albums
Universal Music Italy albums
Vasco Rossi albums
Italian-language albums